Kossou is a town in central Ivory Coast. Since 2013, it has been one of two sub-prefectures of Yamoussoukro Department, Yamoussoukro Autonomous District. The town is named after nearby Lake Kossou.

Kossou was a commune until March 2012, when it became one of 1126 communes nationwide that were abolished.

Villages in the sub-prefecture include Zatta.

Notes

Sub-prefectures of Yamoussoukro
Former communes of Ivory Coast